NGC 107 is a spiral galaxy estimated to be about 280 million light-years away in the constellation of Cetus. It was discovered by Otto Struve in 1866 and its magnitude is 14.2.

Notes

References

External links
 

0107
001606
Cetus (constellation)
Astronomical objects discovered in 1886
Discoveries by Otto Struve
Spiral galaxies